Mohamed Abed Bahtsou (born 25 December 1985) is an Algerian professional footballer. He plays as a midfielder. From 2009 to 2010 he played for USM Blida.  From 2010 to 2012 he played for CA Bordj Bou Arréridj. In 2014-2015 he played for ASM Oran.

References

External links
Lnf.dz

1985 births
Living people
Algerian footballers
Association football midfielders
CA Bordj Bou Arréridj players
USM Blida players
USM Bel Abbès players
Algerian Ligue Professionnelle 1 players
Algerian Ligue 2 players
21st-century Algerian people